The Echo of Thunder is an Australian family drama film, released for television in 1998. It is based on the novel Thunderwith by Australian children's author Libby Hathorn. It was aired on CBS in the United States as a Hallmark Hall of Fame presentation.

The film is a story of a man Larry Ritchie, who lives with his second wife and three kids on an Australian farm in the Wallingat Forest NSW. He learns about the fatal illness of his first wife which leaves his eldest daughter, Lara, alone in the world. Larry decides to take the girl into his home, but his new family doesn't like the idea. The mother Gladwyn is possessive of Larry and their three children, Pearl, Opal and Jasper. Lara seeks solace with a mysterious dog she names Thunderwith that appears from time to time on the property. The dog seems to the girl to be a link to her beloved mother and an important companion. The story concentrates on the relationship between mother Gladwyn and stepdaughter, as Lara is slowly accepted into the family.

The film was shot in Mount Beauty, Victoria and directed by Simon Wincer. Hallmark Channel produced the movie and the story undertook several changes for example the four Ritchie children became only three on the set. Judy Davis, who played the mother Gladwyn was nominated for an Emmy for her performance in the movie.

Starring
Jamey Sheridan as Larry Ritchie
Judy Davis as Gladwyn Ritchie
Lauren Hewett as Lara Ritchie
Chelsea Yates as Pearl Ritchie
Emily Browning as Opal Ritchie
Ben and James Hanson as Jasper Ritchie
Michael Caton as Bill Gadrey

References

External links

1998 television films
1998 films
1998 drama films
Hallmark Hall of Fame episodes
Australian drama television films
Films directed by Simon Wincer
Films scored by Laurence Rosenthal
1990s English-language films
1990s Australian films